Joseph Ligon (born 1937 or 1938) is an American convicted murderer and former prisoner. He was America's longest-serving prisoner who was convicted to a life sentence as a minor. At 15, he was found guilty of murder by association and sentenced to life in prison without the possibility of parole. After the US Supreme Court had ruled in 2016 that all juvenile life sentences without parole were retroactively unconstitutional, he was released in 2021, having spent 68 years in jail.

Early life
Ligon grew up on a farm in Alabama and had a difficult early life. He dropped out of school in third or fourth grade without being able to read or write. At 13, he moved to Philadelphia with his family.

Conviction for murder
On February 20, 1953, while living in Philadelphia, Ligon was part of an alcohol-fueled violent spree by five teenagers that resulted in the murders of Charles Pitts and Jackson Hamm. He met up with two teenagers he knew casually and they came across two other teenagers, previously unknown to him, who were drinking wine. They began robbing people to try to buy more alcohol.

After his arrest he claimed he was not permitted legal representation or family visitation and signed confessions put in front of him by the police; he was 15 years old. Ligon and the other defendants had a one-day trial and they were convicted of first degree murder and sentenced to life in prison without parole.

At the time of his trial, Ligon admitted to stabbing one person who survived the attack. He has affirmed his guilt for the stabbing and expressed remorse subsequently. He has always denied being responsible for either murder.

Ligon and his accomplices were offered clemency in the early 1970s. Ligon was the only one to refuse the offer, rejecting it since he would have to be on parole.

Parole

Bradley Bridge, his attorney for 15 years, said that Ligon had been found guilty by association and that if he were tried today, he would more likely be convicted of manslaughter and sentenced to 5 or 10 years. Bridge said giving an adult sentence to a child is inherently wrong.

In 2012, life sentences for juveniles without the possibility of parole were ruled to be unconstitutional in the US Supreme Court. In 2016, the Supreme Court said that the 2012 ruling was retroactive. In 2017, Ligon was resentenced to 35 years in jail and became eligible for parole due to the time already served. Ligon felt his sentence had always been unconstitutional, so he returned to court to argue against the parole. The federal court agreed and in February 2021 he was released without parole.

Release
Ligon was released on February 11, 2021, from State Correctional Institution - Phoenix When Bridge went to the jail to collect him, he remarked Ligon was completely calm—he didn't have an "oh my god" reaction and there was no drama. A month later, Ligon remarked about his release: "It was like being born all over again. Because everything was new to me – just about everything".

Upon his release, Ligon became America's longest serving juvenile lifer, having served 68 years behind bars. The Vera Institute of Justice estimated it cost the state of Pennsylvania nearly three million dollars ($44,000/year) to incarcerate him.

References

1930s births
Living people
Criminals from Alabama
Criminals from Philadelphia
People paroled from life sentence
American prisoners sentenced to life imprisonment
Year of birth missing (living people)